The 1934 Massachusetts gubernatorial election was held on November 6, 1934.

Democratic Mayor of Boston James Michael Curley was elected to his only term as Governor of Massachusetts.

Democratic primary

Governor

Candidates
 Charles H. Cole, former Adjutant General of Massachusetts and nominee for Governor in 1928
 James Michael Curley, Mayor of Boston and nominee for Governor in 1924
 Frank A. Goodwin, former Registrar of Motor Vehicles (also running as a Republican)

Results

Lt. Governor

Candidates
Joseph L. Hurley, Mayor of Fall River
Francis E. Kelly, member of the Boston City Council and candidate for Lt. Governor in 1932

Results

Republican primary

Governor

Candidates
Gaspar G. Bacon, Lieutenant Governor
Frank A. Goodwin, former Registrar of Motor Vehicles (also running as a Democrat)

Withdrew
Alvan T. Fuller, former Governor of Massachusetts

Results

Lt. Governor

Candidates
John W. Haigis, former Treasurer and Receiver-General of Massachusetts

Results
Haigis was unopposed for the Republican nomination.

General election

Candidates
John W. Aiken, nominee for Vice President of the United States in 1932 (Socialist Labor)
Gaspar G. Bacon, Lieutenant Governor (Republican)
James Michael Curley, Mayor of Boston (Democratic)
Freeman W. Follett, resident of Haverhill (Prohibition)
Frank A. Goodwin, former Registrar of Motor Vehicles (Equal Tax)
Alfred Baker Lewis, attorney, civil rights activist, and perennial candidate (Socialist)
Edward Rand Stevens, candidate for Lieutenant Governor in 1924 (Communist)

After losing both the Democratic and Republican primaries, Goodwin entered the general election as an independent on the "Equal Tax" platform.

Results

See also
 1933–1934 Massachusetts legislature

References

Bibliography

Governor
1934
Massachusetts
November 1934 events